Jason Silvis is an American politician. He is a Republican member of the Pennsylvania House of Representatives, representing the 55th district in parts of Westmoreland County, Armstrong County, and Indiana County since 2021.

Biography
Silvis graduated from Kiski Area High School in 1994.

In 2020, Silvis was elected to the Pennsylvania House of Representatives representing the 55th district, which includes parts of Westmoreland County, Armstrong County, and Indiana County. He defeated incumbent Democratic representative Joseph Petrarca with 52.3% of the vote in the November general election.

Career

Committee assignments 

 Agriculture & Rural Affairs
 Children & Youth
 Game & Fisheries
 Human Services

References

External links
Pennsylvania House of Representatives profile

Living people
Republican Party members of the Pennsylvania House of Representatives
21st-century American politicians
Year of birth missing (living people)